In the National Football League, an illegal procedure is used to refer to a number of different penalties.

Types of illegal procedure 
Some penalties are signalled with a generic "illegal procedure" signal. Examples are: 
False start
Illegal formation
Kickoff or safety kick out of bounds
Player voluntarily going out of bounds and returning to the field of play on a punt

Some examples of similar penalties have their own signals. Examples include: 
Illegal shift
Illegal motion
Illegal forward pass
Illegal touching of a forward pass
Ineligible receiver downfield
Illegal substitution

Usage at different levels 

It is used similarly to the professional level at the high school level, but this term is not referenced at all in the collegiate rule book.

References 

Gridiron football rules
American football terminology